Robbie Bryant (born 1 March 1979, Masterton, New Zealand) is professional boxer.

Bryant has achieved allot in his boxing career, including winning multiple title in the Amateurs, hold a regional title from IBF & WBA and Peaking as high as 8 in the WBA World rankings in the Middleweight division.

Bryant has three other brothers in his family, including IBO Asia Pacific, WBFed Oceania and New Zealand National (NZNBF Version) Cruiserweight Champion Lance Bryant. In 1995, all four brothers won a New Zealand Amateur National Title's in the Junior and Intermediate Division. In 2016, both Lance and Robbie got to fight on the same card for the first time as professionals in their hometown.

Amateur boxing titles
1994 New Zealand Amateur Featherweight Champion (Junior Division) 
1995 New Zealand Amateur Lightweight Champion (Intermediate Division) 
1996 New Zealand Amateur Light Welterweight Champion (Intermediate Division)

Professional boxing titles
Australian Western Australia State
Australia – West Australia State middleweight title (159¼ Ibs)
World Boxing Association  
PABA middleweight title (159½ Ibs)
International Boxing Federation 
IBF Australasian middleweight title (159½ Ibs)

Professional boxing record

References

1979 births
Living people
Sportspeople from Masterton
New Zealand male boxers